Charles Isaac Elton, QC (6 December 1839 – 23 April 1900) was an  English lawyer, antiquary, and politician.

He is most famous for being one of the authors of the bestselling book The Great Book-Collectors.

He was born in Southampton.  Educated at Cheltenham and Balliol College, Oxford, he was elected a fellow of Queen's College in 1862. He was called to the bar at Lincoln's Inn in 1865. His remarkable knowledge of old real property law and custom helped him to an extensive conveyancing practice and he took silk in 1885. He sat in the House of Commons for West Somerset in 1884–1885 and for Wellington, Somerset, from 1886 to 1892. In 1869 he succeeded to his uncle's property of Whitestaunton Manor, near Chard, Somerset.

During the later years of his life he retired to a great extent from legal practice, and devoted much of his time to literary work. He died at Whitestaunton.
Elton's principal works were
 The Great Book-Collectors (1864);
 The Tenures of Kent (1867);
 Treatise on Commons and Waste Lands (1868);
 Law of Copyholds (1874);
 Origins of English History (1882);
 Custom and Tenant Right (1882).
 William Shakespeare: His Family and Friends (1903), ed. from posthumous papers by A. Hamilton Thompson

Virginia Woolf often quotes his poem "Luriana Lurilee" in her novel To the Lighthouse (1927), although the poem itself was not published until 1945.

References

 Virginia Woolf Web. "Luriana Lurilee", retrieved 23 November 2006.

External links

 
 
 

1839 births
1900 deaths
Members of the Parliament of the United Kingdom for English constituencies
English King's Counsel
Writers from Southampton
UK MPs 1880–1885
UK MPs 1886–1892
English antiquarians
Politicians from Southampton